The Thundering Herd is a 1933 American pre-Code Western film directed by Henry Hathaway and starring Randolph Scott, Judith Allen, Buster Crabbe,  Noah Beery, Sr. and Harry Carey. 

Based on the novel The Thundering Herd by Zane Grey, the film is about two buffalo hunters (portrayed by Randolph Scott and Harry Carey) who face dangers with the Indians and a gang of outlaws. The Thundering Herd is a remake of the 1925 film The Thundering Herd. Both Noah Beery, Sr. and Raymond Hatton, Wallace Beery's frequent screen comedy partner during the late 1920s, reprised their roles. Randolph Scott played Jack Holt's role, with Scott's hair darkened and a moustache added so as to match original footage featuring Holt that was incorporated into the later version to hold down costs. The 1933 film is now in the public domain and also known as Buffalo Stampede, the title Favorite Films used in their 1950 reissue of the film. 

Hathaway directed much of the same cast (Scott, Beery, Carey and Crabbe) that same year in another Zane Grey story, Man of the Forest, and that same year a Zane Grey film with Scott, Beery, and Crabbe titled To the Last Man also starring Esther Ralston and featuring an unbilled Shirley Temple in an extremely memorable sequence. Hathaway also directed Scott, Beery and Carey in the Zane Grey opus Sunset Pass that same year.

Cast

 Randolph Scott as Tom Doan
 Judith Allen as Millie Fayre
 Buster Crabbe as Bill Hatch, stagecoach driver
 Noah Beery, Sr. as Randall Jett
 Raymond Hatton as Jude Pilchuk
 Blanche Friderici as Mrs. Jane Jett
 Harry Carey as Clark Sprague
 Monte Blue as Smiley
 Barton MacLane as Pruitt

Critical reception
Reporting that the "less ambitious silent version [of 1925] probably cleared more profit than this more costly production," a contemporary review in Variety noted for this film that "no little care has been exercised to keep the production accurate," that "[a]ction is helped by the fact that none of the players appears in most westerns," but that although "[p]roductionally this is a much better picture than the average western [...] it's a western and can't live it down."

References

External links
 
 
 
 

1933 films
1933 Western (genre) films
Films based on works by Zane Grey
American Western (genre) films
1930s English-language films
Films based on American novels
Films directed by Henry Hathaway
American black-and-white films
Films scored by Karl Hajos
1930s American films